Frederick Edward John Miller (November 24, 1824 – May 11, 1888) was a brewery owner in Milwaukee, Wisconsin. Born as Friedrich Eduard Johannes Müller in Riedlingen, Württemberg,  he founded the Miller Brewing Company at the Plank Road Brewery, purchased in 1855. He learned the brewing business in Germany at Sigmaringen.

Miller married Josephine Miller in Friedrichshafen, Württemberg, on June 7, 1853.  Their first child, Joseph Edward Miller, was born the next year. In 1854, the family emigrated to the United States, spending the first year in New York. They moved to Wisconsin in 1855, arriving through New Orleans.

Josephine died in April 1860 and Miller married Lisette Gross and had five children who survived infancy: Ernst, Emil, Frederick II, Clara, and Elise. Clara married Carl A. Miller (no relation), also a German immigrant.

Frederick Miller once owned a tract of land in the Upper Peninsula of Michigan that is now Craig Lake State Park.

Miller died of cancer in 1888 at age 63, and was buried in the Calvary Cemetery in Milwaukee.  Following his death, the company was run by his surviving three sons and son-in-law Carl.

Miller's younger daughter Elise was the mother of Harry G. John (1919–1992), president of the company from 1946 to 1947 and founder of the De Rance Corporation, once the world's largest Catholic charity.

Older daughter Clara's son Frederick C. Miller (1906–1954) was an All-American college football player at Notre Dame under Knute Rockne and became president of the company after John in 1947. He and his 20-year-old son Fred, Jr., were killed in a plane crash in Milwaukee in 1954. The nine-passenger twin-engine company aircraft was a converted Lockheed Ventura. It was bound for Winnipeg for a December hunting trip at Portage la Prairie; the crash also killed the two company pilots, brothers Joseph and Paul Laird.

See also
 Eberhard Anheuser
 Jacob Best
 Valentin Blatz
 Adolphus Busch
 Adolph Coors
 Gottlieb Heileman
 Frederick Pabst
 Joseph Schlitz
 August Uihlein

References

Further reading 
 John, Tim. The Miller Beer Barons: The Frederick J. Miller Family and Its Brewery. Oregon, Wis: Badger Books, 2005.

External links

Fred Miller Brewing Co., Milwaukee, U.S.A. Illustrated booklet with portrait

1824 births
1888 deaths
People from Riedlingen
People from the Kingdom of Württemberg
German emigrants to the United States
Businesspeople from Milwaukee
American brewers
American company founders
19th-century American businesspeople